Lactic may refer to:

Lactic acid
 Lactic acid bacteria
 Lactic acid fermentation

See also

Milk